Traps is the third full-length album released on June 12, 2012 by the Milwaukee-based band Jaill, and their third release on US label Sub Pop.

Track listing

References

External links
Traps on Sub Pop
Jaill on Sub Pop

2012 albums
Jaill albums
Sub Pop albums